E 66 is a road in the United Arab Emirates. The road connects the city of Dubai to the interior city of Al Ain in the Eastern Region of the Emirate of Abu Dhabi. E 66 runs roughly perpendicular to E 11 (Sheikh Zayed Road) and E 311 (Sheikh Mohammad Bin Zayed Road Road). Beginning in the locality of Oud Metha, E 11 progresses southward towards the interior. The road is referred to as "Dubai-Al Ain Road", after its intersection with Emirates Road south of the city of Dubai, and "Tahnoun Bin Mohammad Al Nahyan Road", after Sheikh Tahnoun, the Ruler's Representative in the Eastern Region of Abu Dhabi.

Description
It goes through the towns of Al-Faqa' (shared by the Emirates of Abu Dhabi and Dubai) and Al-Hayer, and connects to Al Madam in the Emirate of Sharjah via Al-Shwaib. Once in Al Ain, a city that shares a border with Oman, the road becomes Emirates Street and later, Bani Yas Road.

Exits

History
In 2010, the road had been revamped in two phases. The first phase contained 3 lanes in each direction, and stretched  from Al-Towayya to Al-Masaken. The second phase contained 4 lanes in each direction, and stretched  from Al-Masaken to Al-Faqa'. In November 2018, under the directives of Sheikh Mohammed bin Zayed Al Nahyan, the road was renamed after Sheikh Tahnoun.

See also
 List of roads in Dubai

References

Eastern Region, Abu Dhabi
Emirate of Dubai
Roads in the United Arab Emirates
Transport in Al Ain
Transport in Dubai